Punch is the debut album by Punch Brothers. It was released by Nonesuch Records on February 26, 2008.

The centerpiece of the album is mandolinist Chris Thile's ambitious four movement suite, "The Blind Leaving the Blind". Thile says the piece was written in part to deal with his divorce of 2004. It was composed over the course of a year and a half using Finale composition software. About 30% of the composition involves some improvisation, "like a jazz lead sheet or a written out fiddle tune". Chris Thile has said that his goal was "to fuse the formal disciplines of jazz or classical composition with the vibrancy of bluegrass or folk music song writing". The remainder of the album was co-written by the entire band.

This album, like the group's previous effort How to Grow a Woman from the Ground, was recorded live, with only minimal use of multi-track.

Track listing

Personnel

Producer: Steven Epstein
Engineer: Richard King
Assistant engineers: Hyomin Kang, Don Goodrick
Mixing: Steven Epstein, Richard King
Mastering: Steven Epstein, Richard King
Cover photography: Autumn de Wilde
Wardrobe: Shirley Kurata
Studio photography: John Peets
Design: Loren Witcher
Executive producer: Robert Hurwitz

References

External links
Punch Brothers official website

2008 debut albums
Chris Thile albums
Nonesuch Records albums
Punch Brothers albums